Marty Grabstein (born November 28, 1954) is an American actor, best known for voicing Courage in Courage the Cowardly Dog.

Career
Grabstein's career has included work in films, television series, live sketch comedy, theater and commercials. Grabstein’s film credits include Bury The Evidence and Apartment #5C. His television credits include parts on three Law & Order series, Third Watch, and Conviction.

In addition to roles in several theater productions, Grabstein co-wrote and co-starred with Rick Mowat for their sketch comedy act Lab Rats, which performed to rave reviews in comedy clubs throughout New York City. For instance, as The Lab Rats they were regular performers in Joel Selmeier's One Minute Play Contest about which John Heilpern, in a review in the New York Observer, wrote "one brilliant sketch (created and performed by two lunatics, Marty Grabstein and Rick Mowat) had me on the floor with laughter. Entitled Long Fuse, it had just two lines of dialogue: 
"You got the dynamite?"
There followed a pause, somewhat confused, for 58 seconds. A second man then answered, "No."
That was it! But there were more possibilities for infectious laughter in the mad silence that followed the surprise absurdest question - "You got the dynamite?" - than reams of dialogue could have provided. We must watch out for the comedy team of Mr. Grabstein and Mr. Mowat." During the years they performed in that show they regularly arrived with new material.

Grabstein is well-known for doing the voice of the titular character in the Cartoon Network animated series Courage the Cowardly Dog. Grabstein used a combination of paranoia and panic to make the voice of Courage authentic. In the first season of the cartoon, he actually said many spoken words as Courage. However, for the rest of the series, Grabstein did almost all of the character's dialogue by gibberish and mumbling because the show's producers felt that Courage "talked too much" and wanted the dog to be more laconic.

Grabstein reprised his role as Courage for the TV special, The Fog of Courage, and the crossover movie, Straight Outta Nowhere: Scooby-Doo! Meets Courage the Cowardly Dog.

Personal life
Marty's father, Danny was owner of the well known Grabstein's Deli in Canarsie, Brooklyn and his mother, Edna (née  Bine) was a talented singer who once sang Cabaret at Don't Tell Mama's in New York City. Grabstein currently lives in New Jersey with his wife Nancy and sons Matthew and Daniel.

Filmography
Law & Order (TV series; 1997, 2000, 2003) - Ackerman, Bob, Shlomo Fineberg (live-action) (3 episodes)
Bury the Evidence (film; 1998) - The Nervous Man (live-action)
Courage the Cowardly Dog (TV series; 1999–2002) - Courage the Dog (voice) (52 episodes)
Law & Order: Criminal Intent (TV series 2002) - Pomerantz (live-action) (1 episode)
Dead Air (short; 2002) - Additional voices
Apartment #5C (film; 2002) - Restaurant owner (live-action)
Manhattan's Best Friend (short; 2003) - Additional voices
Law & Order: Special Victims Unit (TV series; 2003) - Ronny Ickles (live-action) (1 episode)
Third Watch (TV series; 2004) - Ted (live-action) (1 episode)
Wonder Showzen (TV series; 2005) - Singing Chest (live-action) (1 episode)
Cartoon Network Racing (video game; 2006) - Courage the Dog (voice)
Conviction (TV series; 2006) - Saul Mincheff (live-action) (1 episode)
Hanging Plant (short; 2009) - Plant guy (live-action)
FusionFall (video game; 2009) - Courage the Dog (voice)
Cartoon Network 20th Anniversary (TV movie; 2012) - Courage the Dog (voice)
The Fog of Courage (CGI short; 2014) - Courage the Dog (voice)
A Cat's Tale (film; 2015) - Rob (live-action)
 Straight Outta Nowhere: Scooby-Doo! Meets Courage the Cowardly Dog (film; 2021) - Courage the Dog, Mr. McGill/Clown (voice)

References

External links

1954 births
Living people
American male film actors
American male television actors
American male voice actors
Male actors from New York City
Place of birth missing (living people)